is a Japanese badminton player. She competed for Japan at the 2012 Summer Olympics.

Achievements

BWF World Junior Championships 
Girls' singles

BWF Superseries 
The BWF Superseries, launched on 14 December 2006 and implemented in 2007, is a series of elite badminton tournaments, sanctioned by Badminton World Federation (BWF). BWF Superseries has two level such as Superseries and Superseries Premier. A season of Superseries features twelve tournaments around the world, which introduced since 2011, with successful players invited to the Superseries Finals held at the year end.

Women's singles

  BWF Superseries Finals tournament
  BWF Superseries Premier tournament
  BWF Superseries tournament

BWF Grand Prix 
The BWF Grand Prix had two levels, the BWF Grand Prix and Grand Prix Gold. It was a series of badminton tournaments sanctioned by the Badminton World Federation (BWF) which was held from 2007 to 2017.

Women's singles

  BWF Grand Prix Gold tournament
  BWF Grand Prix tournament

BWF International Challenge/Series 
Women's singles

  BWF International Challenge tournament
  BWF International Series tournament

References

External links 

 
 

1991 births
Living people
Sportspeople from Miyagi Prefecture
Japanese female badminton players
Badminton players at the 2012 Summer Olympics
Olympic badminton players of Japan
Badminton players at the 2010 Asian Games
Badminton players at the 2018 Asian Games
Asian Games gold medalists for Japan
Asian Games medalists in badminton
Medalists at the 2018 Asian Games